Sir Richard Graham, 1st Baronet of Esk (c. 1583 - 28 January 1654) was an English politician elected to the House of Commons (1626 to 1629). He fought in the English Civil War for the royalist army.

Career

Graham was born eldest son of Fergus Graham (sometimes, Grahme) of Plump, Kirkandrews-upon-Esk, in Cumberland, and Lady Sybella Bell, daughter of Sir William Bell, of the Bell Clan, Scotsbrig, Middlebie. His siblings included four + younger brothers: William Graham, of Plomp; Francis Graham; Reginald Graham, of Nunnington; Matthew Graham; and one sister, Elizabeth Scott.

By 1624, Graham married Lady Catharine Musgrave (~1602-1660), daughter of Sir Thomas Musgrave, of Cumcatch, Cumberland and his wife, Lady Ursula Carnaby. Together they had seven children (two sons and five daughters): Lady Agnes Johnstone (~1624-1682), married John Ambrose Johnstone, I of Poldean, Scotland (Clan Johnstone); Henrietta Maria Graham; Catherine Graham; Elizabeth Herron; Susan Carnaby.

Sir Thomas Musgrave of Cumcatch and Susannah Thwaites

Graham's eldest son and heir was Sir George Graham (~1625-1658), 2nd Baronet of Esk and Netherby; he married Lady Mary (Johnstone), the daughter of James Johnstone, 1st Earl of Hartfell, and Lady Margaret (Douglas); and younger son, Sir Richard Graham (1635-1711), became 1st Baronet of Norton Conyers, married Lady Elizabeth Fortescue, daughter of Col. Sir Chichester Fortescue and Lady Elizabeth (Slingsby).

Graham served as Gentleman of the Horse to George Villiers, 1st Duke of Buckingham. On 18 February 1623 he set out with Buckingham and Prince Charles, who assumed the names Tom and James Smith to travel incognito to Madrid to meet the Infanta, an expedition known as the Spanish Match.

In 1624, Graham bought the manor of Norton Conyers in the North Riding of Yorkshire.  

In 1626, he was elected Member of Parliament ("M.P") for Carlisle. He was re-elected MP for Carlisle in 1628 and sat until 1629, at which time King Charles decided to rule without parliament, for eleven years. 

On 29 March 1629, he was entitled baronet of Esk, Cumberland. He purchased the estate of Netherby and the Barony of Liddell in Cumberland.

During the Wars of the Three Kingdoms (1639 – 1653), Graham supported the Royalist cause. On 2 July 1644, he fought in the Battle of Marston Moor and suffered serious injuries.

Lady Catherine died 23 March 1650 and is buried at Wath Upon Dearne in Yorkshire. Graham died 28 January 1654; and buried beside his wife on 11 February 1654.

References

1580s births
1654 deaths
English MPs 1626
English MPs 1628–1629
Cavaliers
Baronets in the Baronetage of England